Boy howdy or Boy Howdy may refer to:

boy howdy (idiom), an interjection used in the US
Boy Howdy, an American band (extant 1990 – 1996)
Boy Howdy, a mascot of the American magazine Creem (extant 1969 – 1989)